Réhahn (born on 4 May 1979 in Bayeux in Normandy, France) is a French photographer based in Hoi An, Vietnam. Known as the photographer that "captures souls", he is recognized for his portraits of Vietnam, Cuba, Malaysia and India, and for his cultural preservation work.

In 2011, he launched The Precious Heritage Project with the goal of increasing recognition of Vietnam's diverse tribes through stories examples of their craftsmanship, and large scale portraits of each group in their traditional clothing. The project explores the histories as well as the changing futures of the tribes as globalization and development alter their homelands and subsequently their traditions.

On January 1, 2017, Réhahn opened the Precious Heritage Art Gallery Museum with the goal of creating a single place to preserve the artifacts and costumes he'd been given by the chiefs of many tribes as well as to share the portraits, stories and musical traditions of the ethnic groups. The museum is free to the public.

Réhahn completed his primary mission of meeting all 54 officially recognized ethnic groups in September 2019 and continues his research to discover the numerous subgroups that are spread throughout the country.

Career 
In 2007, the artist travelled to Vietnam for the first time on a humanitarian mission with the French NGO Les Enfants du Vietnam. He explored the country and its culture and captured more than 50,000 photographs. In 2011, after several more trips, he decided to move to Vietnam and settled in the UNESCO heritage town of Hoi An. It was there that he captured "Hidden Smile",  the photograph of Madame Xong, captain of a small tourist riverboat, which has since been published in more than 100 articles worldwide. In 2014, he chose this photograph for the cover of his first book, "Vietnam, Mosaic of Contrasts", a collection of 150 photographs depicting the diversity of the country. A bestseller in Vietnam, the book is now sold in 29 countries.

The photographer's work became known in France when the French travel TV program Échappées Belles (France 5), featured him in a documentary about Vietnam on June 15, 2016.

Following the success of his first book, Réhahn published “Vietnam, Mosaic of Contrasts, Volume II” in 2015 and “Vietnam, Mosaic of Contrasts, Volume III” in 2020. In addition to this series, he released two coffee table size editions - “The Collection, 10 Years of Photography” (2018) and “100 Iconic Portraits” (2019)-  to showcase his photographic work in Cuba, Malaysia, South and Centra America, and the Indian subcontinent in addition to Vietnam.

The Precious Heritage Project 

In 2013, while travelling to meet the tribes of northern Vietnam, Réhahn witnessed not only the diversity and the rich culture of these groups but also the fragility of their heritage. Traditional costumes, dialects, rites and ancestral knowledge are fading or being replaced by other methods as the country's development increases. Réhahn started to collect traditional costumes generally offered by the chief of the village themselves in order to preserve and present their culture.

On 1 January 2017, he opened the Precious Heritage Art Gallery Museum. Created to foster intellectual curiosity and open the doors to understanding and communication with the diverse ethnicities present in Vietnam, the museum attracts both tourists and locals. Within 500 square meters, this cultural art space showcases more than 200 photographs of members from each group in their traditional dress. Displayed alongside the photographs are more than 65 authentic tribal costumes, some of them were given by the village chief as a means of preservation since many of these garments are no longer being made. Each ethnic group is presented with factual information and the stories of Réhahn's encounter with the tribe. The texts are available in English, French and Vietnamese.

In September 2019, Réhahn completed his primary mission of researching, meeting, and documenting each of the 54 ethnic groups in Vietnam.

The Giving Back Project 
The Giving Back Project is a way for "the artist [to take] on social responsibility by giving back to those who inspired the image. With this philosophy of "conscious photography", both the subject and the artist benefit."

The project started with Madam Xong. Her portrait was featured on the cover of the photographer’s first book - Vietnam, Mosaic of Contrasts, Volume I and garnered international press attention. As a gesture of gratitude, the artist asked Madame Xong what she wished for the most. She requested a new rowboat so that she could be proud to ferry tourists around the city. 

In addition to supporting the personal needs of his subjects in the form of support for medical, educational and livelihood essentials, The Giving Back Project also aims to improve the long term living conditions of entire communities through education initiatives.

In September 2018, the BBC published an article featuring the artist’s portrait of "An Phuoc" entitled "The Photos that Change Lives". The article gives details about Réhahn's Giving Back Project alongside initiatives of other photographers such as Ami Vitale and Kenro Izu "whose commitment to their subjects goes far beyond sharing their photographic stories".

Notable works 
 "Best Friends" Taken in 2014, this photograph depicts Kim Luan, a 6-year-old M'nong girl, praying in front of an elephant. Thanks to the press agency Caters in New York, the picture has been published in more than 25 countries and made the cover of magazines such as Conde Nast Traveler, The Times and National Geographic.
 "Hidden Smile"  - The portrait of Madame Xong was chosen to officially enter the permanent collection of the Vietnamese Women's Museum in Hanoi. In March 2018, French President Emmanuel Macron was presented with a limited edition copy of the portrait, to commemorate 45 years of diplomatic relations between France and Vietnam.
 In 2015, the photographs “Best Friends” and “Hidden Smile” became part of the collection at the Asian House Museum in Havana, Cuba, as a result of the exhibition « Valiosa Herencia » (Precious Heritage).
 "An Phuoc" -  This photograph has been featured in numerous Vietnamese publications, as well as international media such as National Geographic, BBC, Business Insider, Independent UK and the covers of Globe-Trotters and Geo magazine in France.

Awards and recognition 

In December 2014, Réhahn was ranked fourth of the top 10 best travel photographers in the world, along with Steve McCurry, by the website boredpanda.com. This article was translated into more than 20 languages.

January 2016, he was ranked the second most popular French photographer on the internet by French website lense.fr.

March 2018, the artist was honored during an official ceremony to commemorate 45 years of diplomatic relations between France and Vietnam when Vietnam's Secretary of the Party, Nguyen Phu Trong, who has since become President of Vietnam, presented French President Emmanuel Macron with a limited edition copy of the portrait "Hidden Smile". The same month, Réhahn was awarded the 2018 Trophy for French Nationals Abroad by the French information website lepetitjournal.com.

Publications 

 Vietnam, Mosaic of Contrasts - Volume II - November 2015

 The Collection, 10 Years of Photography - December 2018
 100 Iconic Portraits - November 2019

References

External links 

 
 
 

1979 births
Living people
French photographers